The 1926–27 California Southern Campus Grizzlies men's ice hockey season was the inaugural season of play for the program.

Season
The Southern Campus joined the ranks college hockey programs, founding their program in a sport that had only been in the state for two years. With their team so new, the Grizzlies were only able to schedule six games with two opponents. Southern Campus performed well in the games, winning all despite the score being close in most. Foran scored the first goal in program history. California Southern Campus  were to play USC on March 11 in an unofficial match, but the game was called off due to Southern California's policy against playing CSC. Instead the team played the Palais de Glace club team and lost 4–2. Near the end of their season, the team was formally recognized by the Athletic and Student university councils and officially made a minor sport for the school.

No coach was listed for the team but Artemus Lane served as team manager.

Note: CSC used the same colors as UC-Berkley until 1949.

Roster

Standings

Schedule and Results

|-
!colspan=12 style=";" | Regular Season

References

UCLA Bruins men's ice hockey seasons
California Southern Campus
California Southern Campus
California Southern Campus
California Southern Campus